The Journal of Economic Behavior and Organization is an academic journal published by Elsevier. It was started in 1980 by North-Holland, later merged into Elsevier. It publishes research on economic decision and behaviour influence organizations and markets.

Abstracting and indexing 
The journal is abstracted and indexed in the Social Sciences Citation Index. According to the Journal Citation Reports, the journal has a 2020 impact factor of 1.635, ranking it 225th out of 376 journals in the category "Economics".

See also 
 List of economics journals

References

External links 
 

Economics journals
English-language journals
Publications established in 1980
Elsevier academic journals
Monthly journals